Wilfried (born Wilfried Scheutz; 24 June 1950 – 16 July 2017) was an Austrian singer-songwriter and actor. He was born in Bad Goisern am Hallstättersee, Austria. He was known for representing Austria in the 1988 Eurovision Song Contest with his song "Lisa Mona Lisa". He was also an actor with his best known role was in Hilde, das Dienstmädchen (1986).  From 1978 to 1979 he was a singer for the Austrian band Erste Allgemeine Verunsicherung.

Death
Wilfried died in Lilienfeld, Austria on 16 July 2017 from complications of cancer at the age of 67.

Discography
Albums

 1974: The Crazy Baby
 1979: Nights In The City
 1980: Make Up
 1981: Ganz Normal
 1982: Wunschkonzert
 1983: Ja
 1984: Sehr sehr arg
 1985: Ganz oder gar net
 1986: Nachts in der City - Live
 1987: Leicht
 1988: Feuer auf dem Dach
 1990: Berg und Tal
 1990: Der weiche Kern
 1992: Gemma!
 1994: Katerfrühstück feat. Wilfried
 2012: Tralalala
 2013: Wieder da! Das Live Album
 2017: Gut Lack

Singles

 1973: Mary, Oh Mary 
 1973: Ziwui, Ziwui
 1973: Woodpecker's Music
 1974: `s Katherl
 1974: Go, Go, Go
 1975: Country Blues
 1976: Neonliacht Maria
 1976: Dobermann
 1976: Teifi eini - Tieifi aussi
 1977: Tanz, Franz!
 1978: Hey Big Brother
 1978: Nights In The City
 1978: Johnny's Discothek
 1979: In The Middle Of The Night
 1980: I've Got To Have A Reggae On My LP
 1980: Telephone Terror
 1980: I'm In
 1981: Highdelbeeren
 1981: Buhuhuhu hu
 1981: Ich hab' zuviel Power
 1981: Keiner liebt dich
 1982: Orange
 1983: Lass mi bei dir sein
 1983: Mir san alle froh (Alles leiwand)
 1984: I Like Donnerstag
 1984: Weit, so weit
 1984: Wudu
 1985: Südwind
 1985: Masqumje
 1985: Nix hat Nagel
 1986: Nachts in der City
 1986: Morgenstern
 1987: Leicht
 1987: Ikarus
 1988: Lisa Mona Lisa
 1988: Gratuliere Österreich
 1988: Nur noch mit dir
 1989: Musique, mon amour
 1990: Ebensee
 1990: Sag warum

References

External links

 
 

1950 births
2017 deaths
Austrian singer-songwriters
Austrian male film actors
20th-century Austrian male singers
Eurovision Song Contest entrants for Austria
Eurovision Song Contest entrants of 1988
Deaths from cancer in Austria
21st-century Austrian male singers
People from Bad Goisern